Saint Francis and Brother Leo is a 1609 painting by El Greco, now in the Colegio del Cardenal in Monforte de Lemos, Lugo, Spain.

It shows Francis of Assisi as a meditating hermit, holding a skull. To the left kneels his friend Brother Leo, praying.

Bibliography (in Spanish)
 ÁLVAREZ LOPERA, José, El Greco, Madrid, Arlanza, 2005, Biblioteca «Descubrir el Arte», (colección «Grandes maestros»). .
 SCHOLZ-HÄNSEL, Michael, El Greco, Colonia, Taschen, 2003. .
 https://web.archive.org/web/20100918203001/http://www.artehistoria.jcyl.es/genios/cuadros/6346.htm

1609 paintings
El Greco
Paintings by El Greco